Neuf mois, whose title translates into English as Nine Months, is a 1994 romantic comedy film stars Philippine Leroy-Beaulieu, Catherine Jacob, Patrick Braoudé (who also directed and co-wrote the film), Daniel Russo, Patrick Bouchitey, and Pascal Légitimus. The movie resulted in the 1995 US remake Nine Months.

Plot
Samuel is a psychoanalyst. All day long, he sees patients who express grievances, particularly rebellious teenagers who despise their parents. This has led him to have a dim view of the idea of becoming a parent. That's when his girlfriend, Mathilde, tells him she is pregnant. Terrified of having a child and being a parent, Samuel sees Mathilde's pregnancy as a nightmare. The advice of Samuel's friend, Marc, a womanizer and a bachelor, does not help Mathilde's anxiety.

On the other hand, Dominique, Marc's sister, and her husband, Georges, already have three daughters, and when they learn Dominique is pregnant for the fourth time, they take it in stride. The two couples experience the ups and downs of pregnancy and along the way, build strong knots of friendship.

Cast
 Philippine Leroy-Beaulieu as Mathilde
 Patrick Braoudé as Samuel
 Catherine Jacob as Dominique
 Daniel Russo as Georges
 Patrick Bouchitey as Marc
 Pascal Légitimus as The gynecologist
 Michèle Garcia as The nurse

References

External links

1993 films
1993 romantic comedy films
Films directed by Patrick Braoudé
French romantic comedy films
1990s French-language films
1990s French films